Ralph Shapiro (November 27, 1908 – April 8, 1974) was an American businessman and politician from New York.

Life
He was born on November 27, 1908, the son of Jacob Shapiro and Fanny (Rosenthal) Shapiro. He attended Syracuse University College of Law. He established and ran a paper products wholesale company in Oswego, New York.

Shapiro was Mayor of Oswego from 1960 to 1967; and an alternate delegate to the 1964 Democratic National Convention. On February 14, 1974, he was elected to the New York State Assembly, to fill the vacancy caused by the election of Edward F. Crawford to the New York Supreme Court. He took his seat in the 180th New York State Legislature, but died less than two months later, before the end of the regular legislative session.

On March 29, 1974, while driving back to Oswego from Albany, he suffered a heart attack, and stopped at Crouse Irving Memorial Hospital in Syracuse, New York. During the night, after suffering another heart attack, he was transferred to the State University Hospital where he died on April 8. He was buried at the Riverside Cemetery in Oswego.

References

External links
 

1908 births
1974 deaths
Politicians from Oswego, New York
Mayors of places in New York (state)
Democratic Party members of the New York State Assembly
Syracuse University College of Law alumni
Jewish American state legislators in New York (state)
20th-century American politicians
20th-century American Jews